The Former Tanaka Family Residence (旧田中家住宅) is a Japanese western-style building located in Suehiro, Kawaguchi, Saitama Prefecture.

The building was constructed in 1923 for Tokubei Tanaka, a miso industrialist who later became a politician. The residence is not to be confused with the one located in the Kyōdo-no-Mori museum in Fuchū, Tokyo, which was relocated there.

Architecture 
The building from the outside is constructed in brick. Inside however there are Japanese-style rooms and western-style rooms. The building was unusual for its time that it had three stories already. It is an example of early western influence on architecture in Japan. For example, the wooden staircase is in the western-style. The fusuma sliding door on the outside is western, however the room it leads to is Japanese and therefore the inside of the sliding door is in traditional Japanese-style as well.

See also 
 Kyu-Iwasaki-tei Garden
 Ogasawara-Hakushaku-Tei

References

External links 

Buildings and structures in Kawaguchi, Saitama